Balderstone is a district and an electoral ward of the wider Metropolitan Borough of Rochdale in the county of Greater Manchester, England. According to the 2001 census the ward had a population of 9,699. As at the 2011 census the ward was called Balderstone and Kirkholt with a population of 10,422.

Education

Religion
St Mary's Church on Oldham Road is an Anglican church. It is one of three churches in the South Rochdale Team Ministry of Christ the King; the other two are St Luke's Church, Deeplish and St Peter's Church, Newbold.

Notable person
John Ellis was born in Balderstone and became one of the United Kingdom's executioners. He hanged, or assisted in hanging, over 200 people between 1901 and 1924.

References

Areas of the Metropolitan Borough of Rochdale